Senegalia greggii, formerly known as Acacia greggii, is a species of tree in the genus Senegalia native to the southwestern United States and northern Mexico, from the extreme south of Utah south through southern Nevada, southeast California, Arizona, New Mexico and western Texas to Baja California, Sinaloa and Nuevo León in Mexico. The population in Utah at 37°10' N is the northernmost naturally occurring Senegalia species anywhere in the world.

Common names include acacia bush, catclaw acacia, catclaw mesquite, Gregg's catclaw, paradise flower, wait-a-minute bush, and wait-a-bit tree; these names mostly come from the fact that the tree has numerous hooked prickles with the shape and size of a cat's claw which tend to hook onto passers-by; the hooked person must stop ("wait a minute") to remove the prickles carefully to avoid injury or shredded clothing. (The common name "cat's claw" is also used to refer to several other plant species, including Uncaria tomentosa, a woody vine found in the tropical jungles of South and Central America.) The specific epithet greggii refers to Josiah Gregg, a 19th-century author, explorer, and amateur naturalist of the American Southwest and northern Mexico.

Description

Pinnae are most frequently in two pairs, with the proximal pair perpendicular to the petiolule and the distal pair forming a V at the tip.

The blooms are produced in dense cylindrical spikes of numerous flowers, each individual flower with five cream colored  petals and numerous creamy yellow  stamens. The seed pod is constricted between seeds (a loment), and seed dispersal occurs both through dehiscence and breaks at these constrictions.

Ecology
Senegalia greggii is most common in arroyos where its roots have access to deep water. Its seeds require physical scarification in order to germinate. This effectively prevents germination unless a flash flood disturbs the area and deposits enough water to increase the likelihood that seedlings will be able to establish deep enough roots to survive the dry season. Catclaw is fully drought deciduous and will usually lack leaves for most of the year. S. greggii has extrafloral nectaries, a trait shared with other senegalias. A tentative connection has been made between these glands and insects that would suggest a mutualistic relationship (as found in other Senegalia species).  Ants are known to use the glands as a source of food and water, and may provide some defense for the plant against herbivorous insects. Like other arroyo trees in family Fabaceae, S. greggii is frequently afflicted with Desert Mistletoe, Phoradendron californicum. Unlike other legumes, S. greggii is not known to form root nodule associations with nitrogen-fixing bacteria.

It is argued that this species may be an example of an evolutionary anachronism, in which the range and renewal of the species is limited due to the extinction of the mammalian megafauna responsible for seed dispersal. Within this model, the scarification required to germinate the seeds would have occurred during the chewing and digestion of the fruit by a large mammal, who later passes the seed intact some distance from the original tree.

Gambel quail eat the seeds. Antelope browse the foliage, but more delicate species may do so cautiously on account of the thorns.

Ethnobotany
Senegalia greggii, even though it is used as forage for livestock, contains a potentially poisonous cyanogenic glycoside called prunasin.  Mature seeds are to be avoided, as the native people did. The young, unripe beans of S. greggii were gathered and eaten by desert tribes of North America, including the Chemehuevi of the Southern Paiute, the Pima, and the Cahuilla. The Cahuilla also ground the dried beans for mush and cakes, while the Havasupai ground it to make flour for bread. The Seri ground the beans to meal then mixed it with water and sea lion oil for porridge. The Diegueno used S. greggii as food for domesticated animals.

The Pimas and Tohono O'odham ate the seeds as pinole.
The Cahuilla and Pima used the fibers for sturdy construction material and firewood. The Havasupai split the twigs and used them for basketry, but also used the twigs as a broom to brush off metates. The O'odham used the broken twigs for baskets, and were curved to make intricate weaves in the baskets. The Pima used the dried bushes to pile them to make a brush fence. The branches were used to make cradle frames as well.

The Tohono O'odham fitted the branches around deer hunters' heads to make a disguise, and the buds and blossoms were dried to make perfume sachets by the women. The sticks were also used to dislodge saguaro fruits from the cactus body, and rods were curved to flesh animal skins. The Akimel O'odham made bows out of the wood.

Some chemical compounds found in Senegalia greggii
Beta-methyl-phenethylamine
Catechin
Fisetin
Hordenine
Phenethylamine
Quercetin
Tyramine

Gallery

References

General references
 Barlow, C. (2000). The Ghosts of Evolution:  Nonsensical fruit, missing partners and other ecological anachronisms.  Basic Books:NY.
 Jepson Manual Treatment: Senegalia greggii (as Acacia greggii)
 U.S. Forest Service FEIS Database: Senegalia greggii (as Acacia greggii)
 Lawor, Elizabeth Jane (1995). Archaeological Site-formation Processes Affecting Plant Remains in the Mojave Desert.. University of California, Riverside.
 Range Shrubs
Interactive Distribution Map of Senegalia greggii (as Acacia greggii)

External links

greggii
North American desert flora
Flora of the Chihuahuan Desert
Flora of the Sonoran Deserts
Flora of the California desert regions
Flora of the Rio Grande valleys
Trees of the Southwestern United States
Trees of Baja California
Trees of Chihuahua (state)
Trees of Coahuila
Trees of the South-Central United States
Trees of Nuevo León
Trees of Sinaloa
Trees of Sonora
Trees of Tamaulipas
Natural history of the Colorado Desert
Natural history of the Lower Colorado River Valley
Natural history of the Mojave Desert
Flora of Texas
Forages
Plants used in Native American cuisine